Konstantia (Gostolyubi) is a village in the Exaplatanos municipal unit of the Pella regional unit of Macedonia, Greece. It lies on the road to Foustani at an altitude of 180 meters.

History

Ancient history 

In 1992 in the south of village an ancient cemetery was found dating from the Iron Age (1100–700 BC.) The cemetery consists of almost 40 graves. It is in the side of an ancient road that crosses west Paiko and connects Almopia with Bottiaio. East of the cemetery some remains of an old settlement are saved.
The discoveries from the interior of graves, departments of vessels, cupreous jewels and iron daggers allow the chronology of the findings at around 1100 to 700 BC.

Modern History and Population 
The German sightseer Adolf Struck in 1898 presents Konstantia as a big village with 300 houses and two panes, inhabited exclusively by Pomaks. In 1900, Vasil Kanchov gathered and compiled statistics on demographics in the area and reported that the village of Gostolyubi was inhabited by about 1300 Bulgarian muslims.

The village was incorporated in the Greek territory after the First Balkan War. In 1920 the village numbered 1197 residents, exclusively Muslims.
Ottoman census of the year 1831 village son fatihan 
Before the Balkan wars the village was known as Kosteloyp and was renamed Konstantia in 1925. After the great ethnic exchange and installation of Greek refugees the population reached 1144 in 1940. In the last demographic count of 2001, 759 residents where counted.

The refugees that came with the exchange to the village are mainly inhabitants from Pontus and more specific from the region of Kotyora. The rest are from Trabzon, Gialvalides from the region of Yalova, Tsoromlides from the region Çorum (Çoch oyroym = a lot of Greek) near Ankara and Achmetlides from the region Achmeten (Ak-ntag-meten = mine) also near Ankara. The refugees brought with them grails and pictures that are still saved in the village church.

The village of Konstantia had a dramatic role from the beginning of World War II until the end of Greek civil war. Fifty five men, women and children lost their life. 
In 1947 the village was a victim of the civil war ferocity.  On 10 February, 33 people were killed during an attack from Dimokratikos Stratos Elladas. Many houses were also set of fire.

Administration history 

Administrative changes from 1918 to 2006 :

09/07/1918 - Founding of Kosteloyp community. Kosteloyp settlement set as community seat.
09/07/1918 - Prodromos settlement is merged with Kosteloyp community. 
09/07/1918 - Noboseltsi settlement is merged with Kosteloyp community. 
14/04/1919 - Noboseltsi settlement is extracted by the Kosteloyp community and becomes seat of Noboseltsi community.
14/04/1919 - Prodromos settlement is extracted by the Kosteloyp community and gets merged with the Noboseltsi community.
24/07/1924 -  Muslims were exchanged from Kosteloyp to Turkey.
13/06/1925 - Kosteloyp settlement of Kosteloyp community is renamed to Konstanteia.
13/06/1925 - Kosteloyp community is renamed to Konstanteia's community. 
16/10/1940 - Name of Konstanteia settlement of Konstanteia's community is corrected to Konstantia. 
16/10/1940 - Name of Konstanteia's community is corrected to Konstantias community. 
04/12/1997 - Community of Konstantia is suppressed to Municipality of Exaplatanos (Program I. Kapodistrias).

References

External links 
 Municipality of Exaplatanos

Iron Age Greece
Indo-European archaeological sites
Populated places in Pella (regional unit)
Iron Age sites in Europe